Reg Edwards (born 28 June 1943) is a former  Australian rules footballer who played with South Melbourne in the Victorian Football League (VFL).

After one game with South Melbourne against Collingwood, Edwards returned to Rutherglen, in the Ovens & Murray Football League and kicked 338 goals between 1961 and 1969 and from 1973 to 1975 and 189 senior O&MFL games. 

Edwards was captain-coach of Howlong Football Club in the Hume Football League from 1970 to 1972, leading them to a premiership in 1971.

Notes

External links 

Living people
1943 births
Australian rules footballers from Victoria (Australia)
Sydney Swans players
Rutherglen Football Club players